Golyam Izvor is a village in Stambolovo Municipality, in Haskovo Province, in southern Bulgaria. The village has an almost entirely Roma (gypsy) population.

References

Villages in Stambolovo Municipality